is the first ballad greatest hits album released by Japanese pop rock band Ikimono-gakari. It was released on December 19, 2012 and contains twelve previously released tracks plus a version of the single "Kaze ga Fuiteiru" recorded in the United Kingdom. Having sold 108,000 copies in its first week of sales, it reached number 1 on the Oricon weekly charts for the week ending December 31, 2012 making it the group's fifth consecutive number one album. Consequently, Ikimono-gakari became the first mixed group in over sixteen years to achieve five consecutive number one albums on the Oricon weekly chart.

Release

Editions
The album was released in Japan on December 19, 2012 in two editions: the regular edition (ESCL-4010) and the limited edition (ESCL-4008-9). As well as the CD contained in the regular edition, the limited edition contained an Ikimono-gakari Barādon scarf and the Ikimono card #031.

Title
The title is a combination of the words "ballad" and "donburi"(丼), the latter being a rice dish served with a variety of fish, meat and vegetable toppings served in an oversized rice bowl. The band claim to have decided upon the name whilst touring in Sapporo, Hokkaidō. Originally the band's guitarist, Yamashita Hotaka, was planning on naming the album "バラードだべ" (Barādo-dabe) where "dabe" is a copula in the Hokkaidō dialect, but the band settled for the current title after concluding that "Barādo-dabe" was of poor quality. As a result of the use of "donburi" in the title, the lead singer (Kiyoe Yoshioka) and the two guitarists (Yoshiki Mizuno and Hotaka Yamashita) dressed up as a restaurant landlady and Itamaes respectively for both promotional appearances and the album cover.

Track list
Source for romanized title tracks: Jpopasia.com

Release history

Charts

References

External links
 

2012 albums
Ikimono-gakari albums